XHTBV-FM is a radio station on 100.9 FM in Tierra Blanca, Veracruz, carrying Radiorama's La Bestia Grupera format.

History
XETBV-AM 1580 received its concession on July 6, 1994. It was a 250-watt daytimer. XETBV later moved to 1260 kHz.

XETBV moved to FM in 2010.

References

Radio stations in Veracruz
Radio stations established in 1994
1994 establishments in Mexico